Shmuel Mikunis (10 August 1903 – 20 May 1982) was a communist Israeli politician and member of the Knesset from  1949 until 1974.

Biography
Born in Polonne in the Russian Empire (today in Ukraine), Mikunis immigrated to Mandatory Palestine in 1921. He attended a polytechnic in France, and was qualified as an engineer, working for the Shell Oil Company between 1933 and 1945.

He joined the Palestine Communist Party, and became secretary of its central committee in 1939. In 1944 he was elected to the Assembly of Representatives. When Maki (the Communist Party of Israel) was formed, he joined and served as its secretary until 1974. He also acted as an emissary of the party to communist countries to try to obtain weapons for the 1948 Arab-Israeli War.

A member of the Provisional State Council, he was elected to the first Knesset on Maki's list. He was re-elected in 1951, 1955, 1961, and 1965. In 1960s, Mikunis together with Moshe Sneh led the faction of the Communist Party that tried to distance itself from the Soviet Union's more aggressively anti-Israeli positions, affirmed the Israel's right to exist and opposed the Arab states' policies vis-a-vis Israel, as opposed to Meir Vilner's faction, that wholeheartedly accepted the pro-Soviet line. In 1965 the party finally split and the Mikunas-Sneh party was reduced to one seat in the parliamentary election due to the split (from which Rakah had been formed).

Mikunis lost his seat in the 1969 elections, but re-entered the Knesset in March 1972 as a replacement for Moshe Sneh. Towards the end of the session, Maki and the Blue-Red Movement merged into Moked and Mikunis lost his seat in the 1973 elections.

Bibliography
B'Saar Tkufot (1969)

References

External links

 "The Peoples of Palestine Struggle for National Independence", 1948
 "Israel", (on the Suez crisis) 1957

1903 births
1982 deaths
People from Volhynian Governorate
Israeli people of Ukrainian-Jewish descent
Maki (historical political party) politicians
Members of the Assembly of Representatives (Mandatory Palestine)
Members of the 1st Knesset (1949–1951)
Members of the 2nd Knesset (1951–1955)
Members of the 3rd Knesset (1955–1959)
Members of the 4th Knesset (1959–1961)
Members of the 5th Knesset (1961–1965)
Members of the 6th Knesset (1965–1969)
Members of the 7th Knesset (1969–1974)
Moked politicians
Ukrainian Jews
Jewish socialists
Soviet emigrants to Mandatory Palestine